Doctor in Charge is a British television comedy series based on a set of books by Richard Gordon about the misadventures of a group of doctors. The series follows directly from its predecessor Doctor at Large. It was produced by London Weekend Television and broadcast on ITV during 1972 and 1973. Barry Evans was unable to return for this series.

Doctor in Charge was the largest of all the Doctor series, featuring 43 episodes over two series. Ratings for this series were high and featured regularly in the top 10 programmes on ITV.

Writers for the Doctor in Charge episodes were David Askey, Graham Chapman, Graeme Garden, George Layton, Jonathan Lynn, Bernard McKenna, Bill Oddie, Phil Redmond and Gail Renard.

Cast
 Robin Nedwell – Dr Duncan Waring
 Richard O'Sullivan – Dr Lawrence Bingham
 George Layton – Dr Paul Collier
 Geoffrey Davies – Dr Dick Stuart-Clark
 Ernest Clark – Professor Geoffrey Loftus
 Helen Fraser – Dr. Mary Bingham 
 Sammie Winmill – Nurse Sandra Crumpton 
 Joan Benham – Mrs. Elizabeth Loftus

Episodes

Series 1
 "The Devil You Know"
 "The Research Unit"
 "The Minister's Health"
 "The Black and White Medical Show"
 "Honeylamb"
 "Doctor's Lib"
 "Which Doctor"
 "Climbing the Ladder"
 "Face the Music"
 "Mum's the Word"
 "The Fox"
 "A Night With the Dead"
 "This is Your Wife"
 "Honeymoon Special"
 "The Long, Long Night"
 "The System"
 "On the Brink"
 "Amazing Grace"
 "Shut Up and Eat What You're Given"
 "Yellow Fever"
 "The Taming of the Wolf"
 "An Officer and a Gentleman"
 "That's My Uncle!"
 "The Big Match"
 "The Rumour"
 "Blackmail"
 "Long Day's Journey into Knighthood"

Series 2
 "The Merger"
 "Men Without Women"
 "A Deep Depression Centred Over St. Swithin's"
 "The Epidemic"
 "The Garden Fete"
 "Brotherly Hate"
 "The Loftus Papers"
 "In Place of Strife"
 "The Pool"
 "The Godfather"
 "A Man's Best Friend is His Cat"
 "There's No Fire Without Smoke"
 "Hello Sailor!"
 "Any complaints?"
 "Watch Out – There's a Thief About!"
 "Should Auld Acquaintance Be Forgot?"

DVD releases
On 13 August 2007, Network brought out the Doctor in Charge Season One DVD box-set in the UK. Season Two followed three months later, on 12 November. They both are available in the Region 2 format currently and there's no word on when they'll be released in Region 1 in the U.S.

References

External links
Doctor in Charge at British TV Comedy Guide
Doctor in Charge at Nostalgia Central 

1972 British television series debuts
1973 British television series endings
1970s British sitcoms
Doctor in the House
English-language television shows
First-run syndicated television programs in the United States
1970s British medical television series
ITV sitcoms
London Weekend Television shows
Television shows set in London